Marc Henrichmann (born 1 June 1976) is a German lawyer and politician of the Christian Democratic Union (CDU) who has been serving as a member of the Bundestag from the state of North Rhine-Westphalia since 2017.  He serves the Coesfeld – Steinfurt II constituency, having been directly elected.

Political career 
Henrichmann became a member of the Bundestag in the 2017 German federal election. He is a member of the Committee on Petitions and the Committee on Home Affairs. In this capacity, he serves as his parliamentary group's rapporteur on gun control.

Other activities 
 Foundation for Data Protection, Member of the Advisory Board (since 2022)
 Federal Agency for Civic Education (BPB), Alternate Member of the Board of Trustees (since 2018)
 German Red Cross (DRK), Member

References

External links 

  
 Bundestag biography 

1976 births
Living people
Members of the Bundestag for North Rhine-Westphalia
Members of the Bundestag 2021–2025
Members of the Bundestag 2017–2021
Members of the Bundestag for the Christian Democratic Union of Germany